The 2008–09 Eredivisie Vrouwen was the second season of the Netherlands women's professional football league. The league took place from 21 August 2008 to 31 May 2009 with seven teams. AZ successfully defended the title and became champions for a second year running. The 84 matches of the season had a 56,365 total attendance.

Teams

On 15 April 2008, Roda JC was confirmed as the league's seventh team.

Source: Soccerway

Format
The season was played in a quadruple round-robin format, where all seven participating teams played each other four times (twice away and twice at home), a total of 24 matches each. The champion qualified to the newly created UEFA Women's Champions League. There was no relegation system in place.

Standings

Results

Season's first half

Season's second half

Top scorers

Source: vrouwenvoetbalnederland.nl

References

External links
Official website
Season on soccerway.com

Net
1
2008